National Route 277 is a national highway of Japan connecting Esashi, Hokkaidō and Yakumo, Hokkaidō in Japan, with a total length of 61 km (37.9 mi).

References

National highways in Japan
Roads in Hokkaido